The Survival of St. Joan is a rock opera by Smoke Rise (Gary Ruffin, Hank Ruffin, Stan Ruffin, and Randy Bugg — music composed by Hank and Gary) from an original concept and libretto by Off-Broadway playwright and screenwriter James Lineberger.

Performances 
An initial concert version that ran eight performances was at The Playwrights Unit. Lineberger's fully scripted musical play with spoken dialogue, directed by Chuck Gnys, was next produced at the Studio Arena Theatre in Buffalo, New York, November 5–29, 1970.  Facing a taxi strike and the dubious support of the local Hells Angels, which adopted Joan as their warrior princess, the production then had 16 performances Off-off-Broadway at the Anderson Theatre, directed by Gnys and produced by Haila Stoddard and Neal Du Brock, with a cast that included Gretchen Corbett, F. Murray Abraham, Richard Bright, and Janet Sarno. Smoke Rise performed all the singing, while the actors handled the dialogue. It was then issued by Smoke Rise as a concept 2-record set album on Paramount Records (PAS-9000) produced by Stephen Schwartz and Dave Blume in mid 1971.

Plot
The plot of The Survival of St. Joan was possibly inspired by Operation Shepherdess: The Mystery of Joan of Arc by André Guérin and Jack Palmer White, a revisionist history alleging that Joan of Arc escaped execution and later married a nobleman named Robert des Armoises. An idea rejected by historians, the notion of a legendary Joan who lived on in secret has persisted. Certainly inspired by the Vietnam War, the opera tells of the government of France and Pierre Cauchon, Archbishop of Beauvais, releasing Joan of Arc and allowing a double, also believed to be a witch, to burn in her place. She is sent to live with a mute farmer, who falls in love with her, as he elucidates in songs performed in soliloquy toward the audience. Realizing that there is no end in sight to the Hundred Years' War, the first act ends with Joan seeking to rejoin the army, despite the fact that she is no longer hearing her voices.

In Act II, Joan learns that she has lost the respect of the army, who attempt to rape her. (The libretto in the concept album has Joan raped about halfway through the act; this was changed when stagings went beyond a band performance to a full-fledged play.) She meets with some deserters who no longer understand the meaning of the war, and reject its former religious purposes, complaining that only their generals and the nobility can live above suffering. Alone and anonymous, Joan is eventually found by villagers who mistakenly decide she has put a hex on their cow, tie her to a tree and immolate her, thus ending her life almost as history would have it. Upon her death, Joan re-establishes contact with her three voices, St. Michael, St. Catherine, and St. Margaret.

The play script is held in the North Carolina Collection at the University of North Carolina at Chapel Hill, and remains unpublished. It contains many scene changes, often depicting how ordinary people's lives are affected by the war, including Joan's brother, Charles — acting as a scribe for his mother — requesting the king to provide them Joan's soldier's wages to live on, and chiding her for some irate informalisms she wants to include in the letter.

Songs

Act I
 Survival (Hank)
 Someone is Dying (Gary)
 Run, Run (Gary) — The Voices
 Back in the World (Gary) — Joan
 I'm Here (Gary) — Joan
 Love Me (Gary) — Joan
 Stonefire (Gary) — The Farmer
 Love Me (Part 2) (Gary) — The Farmer; The Child
 Lady of Light (Hank) — The Farmer
 Country Life (Hank) — The Farmer
 Run, Run (Part 2) (Gary) — The Voices
 Precious Mommy (Gary) — The Farmer; The Child

Act II
 Medley (Survival, Run Run; Back in the World) — The Voices, Joan
 Lonely Neighbors (Gary) — People on the Road
 Cornbread (Hank) — Soldiers
 This Is How It Is (Hank) — Joan
 Cannonfire (Gary) — A Wounded Deserter
 It's Over (Hank) — Joan, The Voices
 Darkwoods Lullaby (Hank) — The Voices
 You Don't Know Why (Hank) — The Voices
 Propitius (Gary) — Penitents
 Burning a Witch (Gary) — Penitents
 Love Me (Part 3) (Gary) — Joan in Heaven

Additional Songs for the Expanded Version
 Living with the Devil — Witches
 Her Strength in Battle — Court Poet
 Hymn to the Warrior Saint — Court Poet
 Army Life — Soldiers

Stephen Schwartz worked on an unused song for the expansion called "I'll Call Her Barbara" (The Shepherd).

The album featured a cover painting by Doug Jamieson.

Dramatis Personae 
(in order of appearance)

 The Voices
 Witches (3)
 Pierre Cauchon, The Bishop of Beauvais
 Jeanne d'Arc (Joan of Arc)
 Monks
 Young Witch
 Jailer
 Friar
 Townspeople
 Child
 Mother
 The Shepherd (formerly known as "The Farmer" on the album libretto)
 An English Soldier
 Swineherd
 Barmaid

 Farmer
 Wife
 Boy
 Colonel
 Court Poet
 Girl
 Mme. d'Arc (Joan's mother)
 Charles d'Arc (Joan's brother)
 Three Fishermen
 Soldier
 Corporal
 Whore
 General
 Soldiers and Whores
 John de Stogumber, a blind man
 His Servant

 Villagers
 Woman
 Phillippe, her son
 Passerby
 Scribe
 Deserter
 Leper Woman
 Leprous Thieves
 Fortune Teller
 Hunters
 Four Nuns
 Clerk
 Abbot
 Man
 The Accuser
 Penitents

Original Casts

Studio Arena Theatre, Buffalo, November 1970
F. Murray Abraham — First Friar, Swineherd, Physician, Corporal, Philippe, Friar with Penitents
Bill Braden — Bishop's Monk, Soldier, Leper, Penitent
Mary Carter — Fourth Witch, Barmaid, Whore, Philippe's Mother, First Nun
Tom Carter — Prison Monk, Soldier, Penitent, Leper
John A. Coe — Jailer, Farmhand, English Soldier, Bishop
Gretchen Corbett — Joan
Patrick Ford — Child with Mother, Farmer's Child
Judith Granite — Second Witch, Farmhand's Wife, Whore, Joan's Mother, Fortune Teller, Penitent
Peter Lazer — Hanged Soldier, Deserter, Young Monk, Penitent, Leper
Richard Bright — Farmer
Mac McMack — Third Witch, Poet, Soldier, Joan's Brother, Penitent
George Penrecost — Bishop, Colobel, Lieutenant, Man
Janet Sarno — First Witch, Mother with Child, Court Lady, Whore, Nun, Penitent, Leper Woman
Julia Willis — Young Witch, Court Lady, Girl with English Soldier, Whore, Villager

Anderson Theatre, New York, February 1971
F. Murray Abraham — Prison Monk, Friar I, Swineherd, Corporal, Philippe, Soldier, Accuser
Willie Rook — Beggar Boy, Child, Passer-by, Leper, Villager
Lenny Baker — Jailer, English Soldier, Son, Soldier, Philippe, Leper, Monk with Lantern, Hunter, Penitent, Clerk
Ronald Bishop — Bishop, Soldier, Servant, Nun, Villager
Richard Bright — Farmer
Gretchen Corbett — Joan
Elizabeth Eis — Young Witch, Whore, Passer-by, Nun, Villager
Louis Galterio (replaced with Bill Braden) — Prison Monk, Poet, Another Soldier, Passer-by, Soldier, Monk with Lantern, Hunter, Man
Judith Granite — Country Witch, Wife, Joan's Mother, Whore #1, Passer-by, Fortune Teller, Penitent (also Mother)
Peter Lazer — Prison Monk, Soldier, Passer-by, Deserter, Leper, Monk with Lantern, Hunter, Penitent
Anthony Marciona — Beggar Boy, Boy
Patricia O'Connell — Mother (replaced with Judith Granite), Whore, Passer-by, First Nun, Villager, Phillippe's Mother (2nd)
Janet Sarno — Crazed Witch, Whore #3, Passer-by, Leper Woman, Nun, Penitent
Tom Sawyer — Friar II, Farmer, Soldier, Blind Man, Passer-by, Monk with Lantern
Matthew Tobin — Scribe, Colonel, Soldier, Monk with Lantern, Hunter, Penitent
Sasha von Scherler — Clever Witch, Barmaid, Whore #2, Philippe's Mother (1st), Villager
Steve Reinhardt — Standby for Smoke Rise

Notes

External links
 BadCat Records's Smoke Rise page
 Excerpts from the rock opera The Survival of St. Joan on YouTube
 James Lineberger: biography and poetry
 Operation Shepherdess: The Mystery of Joan of Arc on Google Books
 Smoke Rise Myspace page with songs from Survival

1970 musicals
Off-Broadway musicals
Rock operas
Operas about Joan of Arc